Notker Physicus (died 12 November 975), sometimes called Notker II, was a monk at the Abbey of Saint Gall, active as a physician, painter, and composer. Besides physicus ("the physician"), he was also nicknamed piperis granum (pepper grain) on account of his strict discipline.

Life and career
Concerning his life it is only known that in 956 or 957 he became cellarius (cellarer), and in 965 hospitarius (hospitaller) at the Abbey of Saint Gall. He made several paintings, which were extolled by Ekkehard IV, who also mentions some antiphons and hymns, including "Rector aeterni metuende secli". Notker is probably to be identified with the Notker notarius (a notary) who enjoyed great consideration at the court of Otto I of Germany on account of his skill in medicine, and whose knowledge of medical books is celebrated by Ekkehard. In 940 this Notker wrote at Quedlinburg the confirmation of the immunity of Saint Gall. This is in accord with the great partiality later shown by the Ottos towards the monk, as when they visited Saint Gall in 972.

Another Notker, who died on 15 December 975, was a nephew of Notker Physicus. No documentary information concerning him is available until his appointment as Abbot of Saint Gall in 971. Otherwise also the sources are silent concerning him, except that they call him abba benignus (benign abbot) and laud his unaffected piety.

Sources
 
 

975 deaths
Medieval German physicians
Medical writers
10th-century painters
Medieval male composers
Year of birth unknown
10th-century physicians
10th-century composers
10th-century German writers
10th-century Latin writers